The common name leaf cactus (plural leaf cacti) refers to any of the following genera in the family Cactaceae:

Epiphyllum, a genus of epiphytic cacti
Pereskia, a genus with very primitive elements including well developed leaves
Pereskiopsis